Since its founding in 1949, the People's Republic of China (PRC) has had a diplomatic tug-of-war with its rival in Taiwan, the Republic of China (ROC). Throughout the Cold War, both governments claimed to be the sole legitimate government of all China and allowed countries to recognize either one or the other. Until the 1970s, most Western countries in the Western Bloc recognized the ROC while the Eastern Bloc and Third World countries generally recognized the PRC. This gradually shifted and today only  while the PRC is recognized by the United Nations, 179 UN member states (including 18 G20 member states) and the State of Palestine as well as Cook Islands and Niue. Both the ROC and the PRC maintain the requirement of recognizing its view of the One China policy to establish or maintain diplomatic relations.

Recognition of the PRC before it was seated at the UN

1949
The PRC was established on 1 October 1949, when the Chinese Civil War was still underway, and the seat of Government of the Republic of China in Canton was not relocated to Taipei until December 1949. All the countries that recognized the new PRC government in 1949 were communist states.

1950s

1960s

1970s

Recognition of the PRC after it was seated at the UN
The Republic of China, which had occupied China's seat at the United Nations since 1945, was effectively expelled on 25 October 1971, through Resolution 2758 approved in the general assembly of said date. Its seat was taken over by the People's Republic of China from 15 November 1971, and the migration of relations to the PRC soon followed among members of the Western Bloc, except for the United Kingdom, France, Canada, Italy and the Scandinavian Countries which had previously established diplomatic relations.

1970s

1980s

1990s

2000s

2010s

See also 
 PRC
 Foreign relations of the People's Republic of China
 ROC
 Foreign relations of the Republic of China
 Timeline of diplomatic relations of the Republic of China

Notes and references

Notes

References

Foreign relations of China
Cross-Strait relations
China diplomacy-related lists
Political timelines